The discography of My Bloody Valentine, an Irish-English alternative rock band formed in Dublin, Ireland, consists of three studio albums, two mini albums, one live album, two compilation albums, five extended plays, twelve singles and six music videos.

My Bloody Valentine formed in early 1983 and released their debut mini album, This Is Your Bloody Valentine, in January 1985 on Tycoon Records. Featuring the band's original line-up of vocalist David Conway, guitarist Kevin Shields, drummer Colm Ó Cíosóig and keyboardist Christine "Tina" Durkin, the album failed to receive much attention and the band relocated to London, England following its release. In London the band recruited bassist Debbie Googe and subsequently released two EPs—Geek! (1985) and The New Record by My Bloody Valentine (1986)—and the 1987 single "Sunny Sundae Smile". The New Record… and "Sunny Sundae Smile" garnered the band minor underground success, with both placing in the United Kingdom Independent Singles Chart. Conway departed the band soon after and was replaced by vocalist-guitarist Bilinda Butcher in early 1987.

With their new line-up, My Bloody Valentine released a second mini album, Ecstasy, and the standalone single "Strawberry Wine" in November 1987 on Lazy Records. Both releases were moderate critical successes and attracted the attention of Creation Records co-founder Alan McGee, who offered the band a recording contract after a performance in January 1988. During their time on Creation My Bloody Valentine released their most notable material, including two full-length studio albums, Isn't Anything (1988) and Loveless (1991). Both albums, as well as their singles and preceding EPs, were released to widespread critical acclaim; Isn't Anything and Loveless were considered massive independent successes, both peaking at number 1 on the UK Independent Albums Chart. In addition, Loveless placed at number 24 on the UK Albums Chart and has since been certified silver by the British Phonographic Industry. In 1992 My Bloody Valentine were dropped by Creation due to the extensive recording period and production costs of Loveless.

My Bloody Valentine signed to Island Records in October 1992 for a reported £250,000 contract, constructing a home studio in Streatham, South London with their advance. Originally intending to record and release a third studio album, the band experienced a "semi-meltdown", according to Kevin Shields and became largely inactive. Despite rumours that over 60 hours of recorded material had been presented to Island, the band only released two songs—cover versions of Louis Armstrongs "We Have All the Time in the World" and Wires "Map Ref 41°N 93°W"—on various artist compilation albums before their disbandment in 1997.

In 2007 My Bloody Valentine reunited and announced plans to release a third album. The band commenced two international tours between 2008 and 2009, during which time remastered versions of Isn't Anything and Loveless and a box set were announced. Following further delays, remastered editions of the band's original two studio albums and the double compilation album EP's 1988–1991 were released on Sony in May 2012. m b v, My Bloody Valentine's third studio album, was eventually released "out of the blue" in February 2013; it received "universal acclaim", according to Metacritic.

Albums

Studio albums

Mini albums

Live albums

Compilation albums

Extended plays

Singles

Retail singles

Promotional singles

Split singles

Music videos

Compilation contributions

Miscellaneous appearances

References

Bibliography

External links

Alternative rock discographies
Discographies of Irish artists
Discography